"Home" is a song by the Goo Goo Dolls. It is the lead single from their ninth studio album, Something for the Rest of Us, which was released on August 31, 2010. "Home" was released to the Apple iTunes Store on June 8, 2010.

Music video

There are 2 versions of the video.

Version 1:
The video begins with the band sitting on the table while people are eating at the table when they are frozen except for the band. After Johnny sang the chorus, he leaves the table and the scene shifts to a Japanese marketplace where the band are seen playing through the aisles and appeared on a recording camera. At the end of the video, the band ends up back at the table where they sat by the people.

Version 2:
A music video was filmed for the song and featured a young woman wandering around a city at different times of the day, sometimes walking the streets or sitting in a bedroom, alone. The video emphasizes the loneliness and desperation behind the song's lyrics.

Track listing

Other versions

Charts

Weekly charts

Year-end charts

References

2010 singles
Goo Goo Dolls songs
Songs written by John Rzeznik
Songs written by Andy Stochansky
2010 songs
Warner Records singles